Vikram Singh is a film producer who works in Tamil, Telugu, and Hindi-language films.Why he left his wife  and two grownups.

Career 
Vikram Singh made his film debut as a producer with the 1986 Telugu-language film Naya Anubhav. He later became associated with producer Boney Kapoor from the making of Roop Ki Rani Choron Ka Raja (1993) and worked as an executive producer for several Hindi and Tamil films including  Judaai (1997) and The Terrorist (1997). His final project with Kapoor was when working as an online producer and taking care of the United States shoot for Pukar (2000). 

Following conversations with an associate, director Priyadarshan, Vikram opted to begin work as a producer in Tamil cinema, and debuted with 12B (2001). He produced the film under the studio, Film Works. Debutante Shaam was signed for the lead role after meeting with the director, Jeeva and with him. After the release of 12B, Vikram Singh produced the Telugu dubbed version of the film. The promotions of 12B garnered acclaim with Shaam gaining film offers before the film's release. After this, Vikram Singh went on to work with Shaam and music director Harris Jayaraj again for Priyadarshan's Lesa Lesa (2003). The film was a remake of the successful Malayalam film Summer in Bethlehem (1998). In order to concentrate on the venture, Vikram Singh put the film Acham Thavir starring Madhavan and Jyothika on hold. In order to avoid piracy, he released the soundtrack of Lesa Lesa at a cheap rate.

Filmography

As a producer

References

Footnotes

External links 

Living people
Tamil film producers
Telugu film producers
Hindi film producers
Year of birth missing (living people)